Public sector borrowing requirement (PSBR) is the old name for the budget deficit in the United Kingdom. The budget deficit has been renamed the public sector net cash requirement (PSNCR) to avoid confusion with net borrowing.

PSBR occurs when expenditures for the government activities in the public sector of the economy exceed the income.  The resulting deficit is then financed by borrowing funds from the public, usually by the means of government gilts. 

Both PSBR and PSNCR measures are shown in the Office for National Statistics  monthly First Release Public sector finances .

See also
Public sector net cash requirement

Public finance of the United Kingdom